Mary Ann Paton (1802–1864) married names including Mary Ann Wood, was a Scottish vocalist.

Early life
The eldest daughter of George Paton, a writing-master at Edinburgh and amateur violin, and his wife, née Crawford, was born in Edinburgh in October 1802. She and her sisters received a good musical training: they were singers also, Isabella making her début at Mary Ann's benefit at Covent Garden Theatre, 1824, as Letitia Hardy, and Eliza sing at the Haymarket Theatre in 1833.

Mary Ann, aged eight, appeared at public concerts as a singer, performer on the harp and pianoforte (Giovanni Battista Viotti's concerto in G), and recited William Collins's Ode to the Passions and Alexander's Feast. The family settled in London in 1811, and she gave some concerts; but then took a break from performing. She had instrumental lessons from Samuel Webbe the younger, and after six years, began a career as a vocalist, appearing in 1820 at Bath, and in 1821 at Huntingdon.

On the London stage

In 1822 Paton joined the Haymarket company, and on 3 August tried the role of Susanna in the Marriage of Figaro. With critical success she took the roles of the Countess in the same opera, of Rosina in the Barber of Seville, Lydia in Morning, Noon, and Night (George Frederick Perry), and  Polly in the Beggar's Opera. She went on to Covent Garden, as Mandane in Artaxerxes, Rosetta in Love in a Village, Adriana in the Comedy of Errors, and Clara in The Duenna.

Paton's reputation as a dramatic singer grew when, in 1824, she took the part of Agatha in Der Freischütz. A major triumph was her Rezia in Oberon, for which Weber conducted the 16 rehearsals, besides the performance on 12 April 1826, two months before his death. From that time she was considered at the head of her profession. In 1831 she was engaged at the King's Theatre, where she sang in La Cenerentola and other Italian operas. Returning to Drury Lane, she took the part in 1832 of Alice in Robert le diable.

Later life
As Mrs. Wood, she then went to reside at Woolley Moor in Derbyshire, with her husband. In 1840 they visited America for the first time. After their return she retired to a convent for a year, but she reappeared at the Princess's Theatre and at concerts, in which her husband was also engaged.

The Woods finally settled at Bulcliffe Hall, near Chapelthorpe, in Yorkshire, and it was there that Mary Ann Wood died, on 21 July 1864, aged 62.

Family
Paton's father had insisted on her breaking off an engagement with a young medical man named Blood, who went upon the stage for a short time under the name of Davis. She married on 7 May 1824 Lord William Pitt Lennox; they were divorced in the Scottish courts in 1831. In the same year she married Joseph Wood, a tenor singer. She left a son, born in 1838.

See also
List of entertainers who married titled Britishers

References 

Attribution

1802 births
1864 deaths
Scottish operatic sopranos
Musicians from Edinburgh
19th-century Scottish women opera singers